John King DD (d. 2 January 1638) was a Canon of Windsor from 1625 to 1638 and a Canon of Westminster from 1613 to 1638.

Family
He was the second son of John King (Bishop of London).

Career
He was educated at Christ Church, Oxford graduating BA in 1611 and MA in 1614 and DD in 1625.

He was appointed:
Prebendary of Kentish Town in St Paul's Cathedral 1616 - 1639
Public Orator of Oxford 1624
Prebendary of Christ Church, Oxford 1624
Rector of Remenham, Berkshire

He was appointed to the twelfth stall in Westminster Abbey in 1613, a position he held until 1638.

He was appointed to the fifth stall in St George's Chapel, Windsor Castle in 1625, a position he held until 1638.

Notes 

1638 deaths
Canons of Windsor
Canons of Westminster
Alumni of Christ Church, Oxford
Year of birth missing